The Yugurs, Yughurs, Yugu (Western Yugur: Sarïg Yogïr; Eastern Yugur: Šera Yogor), traditionally known as Yellow Uyghurs, are a Turko-Mongolic ethnic group and one of China's 56 officially recognized ethnic groups, consisting of 16,719 persons according to the 2000 census. The Yugur live primarily in Sunan Yugur Autonomous County in Gansu, China. They are mostly Tibetan Buddhists.

Name
The ethnic groups' current, official name, Yugur, derived from its autonym: the Turkic-speaking Yugur designate themselves as Yogïr, "Yugur" or Sarïg Yogïr, "Yellow Yugur" and the Mongolic-speaking Yugur likewise use either Yogor or Šera Yogor, "Yellow Yugur". Chinese historical documents have recorded these ethnonyms as Sālǐ Wèiwùr or Xīlǎgǔr. During the Qing dynasty, the Yugur were also called by a term that included "fān", the Classical Chinese term for Tibetic ethnic groups ("Xīlǎgǔr Yellow Barbarians/Tibetans"). In order to distinguish both groups and their languages, Chinese linguists coined the terms Xībù Yùgùr, "Western Yugur" and Dōngbù Yùgùr, "Eastern Yugur" based on their geographical distribution.

History

The Turkic-speaking Yugurs are considered to be the descendants of a group of Old Uyghurs who fled from Mongolia southwards to Gansu after the collapse of the Uyghur Khaganate in 840, where they established the prosperous Ganzhou Uyghur Kingdom (870-1036) with capital near present Zhangye at the base of the Qilian Mountains in the valley of the Ruo Shui. The population of this kingdom, estimated at 300,000 in Song chronicles, practised Manichaeism and Buddhism in numerous temples throughout the country.

In 1037 the Yugur came under Tangut domination. The Gansu Uyghur Kingdom was forcibly incorporated into the Western Xia after a bloody war that raged from 1028 to 1036.

The Mongolic-speaking Yugurs are probably the descendants of one of the Mongolic peoples that invaded Northern China during the Mongol conquests of the thirteenth century. The Yugurs were eventually incorporated into Qing China in 1696 during the reign of the second Qing ruler, the Kangxi Emperor (1662–1723).

In 1893, Russian explorer Grigory Potanin, the first Western scientist to study the Yugur, published a small glossary of Yugur words, along with notes on their administration and geographical situation. Then, in 1907, Carl Gustaf Emil Mannerheim visited the Western Yugur village of Lianhua (Mazhuangzi) and the Kangle Temple of the Eastern Yugur. Mannerheim was the first to conduct a detailed ethnographic investigation of the Yugur. In 1911, he published his findings in an article for the Finno-Ugrian Society.

Language

About 4,600 of the Yugurs speak Western Yugur (a Turkic language) and about 2,800 Eastern Yugur (a Mongolic language). Western Yugur has preserved many archaisms of Old Uyghur. The remaining Yugurs of the Autonomous County lost their respective Yugur language and speak Chinese. A very small number of the Yugur reportedly speak Tibetan. They use Chinese for intercommunication.

Both Yugur languages are now unwritten, although the Old Uyghur alphabet was in use in some Yugur communities until end of 19th century.

People
The Turkic-speaking Yugur mainly live in the western part of the County in Mínghuā District, in the Townships of Liánhuā and Mínghǎi, and in Dàhé District, in the centre of the county.
The Mongolic-speaking Yugur mainly live in the county's eastern part, in Huángchéng District, and in Dàhé and Kānglè Districts, in the centre of the county.

The Yugur people are predominantly employed in animal husbandry.

Religion

The traditional religion of the Yugur is Tibetan Buddhism, which used to be practiced alongside shamanism.

References

External links
Slide shows, maps and other material on the Yugur from author Eric Enno Tamm
Original Western Yugur texts with English translation plus PDF grammar of Sarig Yugur 

Mongol peoples
Turkic peoples of Asia
Ethnic groups officially recognized by China
Uyghur sub-ethnic groups
Turkic Buddhists